John Brady (20 February 1932 – 4 October 2022) was an Australian rules footballer who played with North Melbourne in the VFL during the 1950s, after being signed by them in 1952 from the Benalla Football Club.

A key position player, Brady was North Melbourne's Syd Barker Medalist in 1954 and placed equal sixth in that year's Brownlow Medal count. He captained North from 1957 to his retirement at the end of the 1959 season. During his career he also represented Victoria at interstate football.

After a year at Ararat, Brady returned to Shepparton as captain-coach of City United and lead them to the 1962 Goulburn Valley Football League premiership.

References

External links

1932 births
2022 deaths
Australian rules footballers from Victoria (Australia)
North Melbourne Football Club players
Syd Barker Medal winners
Shepparton Football Club players
Ararat Football Club players
Shepparton United Football Club players